Helena Rutherfurd Ely (born Helena Rutherfurd: September 28, 1858 – May 18, 1920) was an American author, amateur gardener and founding member of the Garden Club of America whose three books influenced American and British gardeners to avoid Victorian formal gardens in favor of plantings that embodied an "informal and sensual style." She focused on planning her gardens around planting "hardy perennial plants found in the agricultural landscape."

Biography

Helena Rutherfurd was born on September 28, 1858.

At Meadowburn, Ely created formal and cottage gardens on five acres of the estate's grounds which served as the basis for a series of three books on gardening in which she favored perennials.  

Her first book, A Woman's Hardy Garden (1903) sold 40,000 copies and was reprinted 16 times before going out of print in 1930. The book was widely heralded as the most influential practical garden book written by an American woman. 
Her books promoted an informal and sensual style, which moved away from the Victorian practice of ''bedding out'' showy annuals in formal gardens. They gave permission to individuals to do physical garden work due to her social position; and encouraged women to garden.

In 1904, Ely was one of the founding members of the Garden Club of America and was one of its first vice presidents.

Helena Rutherfurd Ely (Fairchild) died on May 18, 1920. She was buried in Warwick Cemetery in Warwick, New York. She received fan mail and queries from fellow gardeners 20 years after her death.

Meadowburn Farm 
Ely and her husband owned a 350-acre country estate named Meadowburn Farm in Vernon Township, New Jersey. Part of Meadowburn was given to Ely by her mother as a wedding gift in 1881. The remainder, including the main house was purchased by Ely from the DeKay family, a colonial family that had settled in this area in the 1720s and played a prominent role in the New York–New Jersey Line War. The Rutherfurd family owned large tracts throughout Sussex County and was descended from early colonial proprietors. Ely spent half of each year on the farm, experimenting with filling plots with the perennial plants.

In 1930, the property was sold to the Coster family who employed Ely's gardener, Albert Furman, to maintain the property. Under Furman and later his son's guidance, the property retained a great number of Ely's plantings.

On August 9, 1993, Meadowburn Farm was placed on the National Register of Historic Places to recognize Helena Rutherfurd Ely's contributions to gardening.

Personal life 
On June 17, 1880, at Trinity Church, in Newark, New Jersey, she married Alfred Ely II (1852–1914), son of Lucy Cooley and Alfred Brewster Ely, who was an attorney and partner in the New York City law firm Agar, Ely & Fulton. They had two children: a son Alfred (III) (1884–1959) and daughter Helena (1881–1970).  

After her husband's death, Helena married Benjamin T. Fairchild in 1916.

Works
  
 1903: A Woman's Hardy Garden
 1905: Another Hardy Garden Book
 1911: The Practical Flower Garden

See also
 National Register of Historic Places listings in Sussex County, New Jersey

References

Further reading
 Dupont, Ronald J., Jr. "Meadowburn Farm: A Flower of American Gardening History," in The North Jersey Highlander Vol. 30 No. 84 (1994), pp. 23–33.

External links 

 Meadowburn Farm

1858 births
1920 deaths
Arts and Crafts movement artists
American garden writers
American landscape and garden designers
American gardeners
American horticulturists
People from Vernon Township, New Jersey
American women non-fiction writers
Rutherfurd family